Pseudozonitis is a genus of blister beetles in the family Meloidae. There are about 17 described species in Pseudozonitis.

Species
These 17 species belong to the genus Pseudozonitis:

 Pseudozonitis arizonica (Van Dyke, 1929)
 Pseudozonitis brevis Enns, 1956
 Pseudozonitis castaneis Dillon, 1952
 Pseudozonitis labialis Enns, 1956
 Pseudozonitis longicornis (Horn, 1870)
 Pseudozonitis maculicollis (MacSwain, 1951)
 Pseudozonitis marginata (Fabricius, 1781)
 Pseudozonitis martini (Fall, 1907)
 Pseudozonitis obscuricornis (Chevrolat, 1877)
 Pseudozonitis pallidus Dillon, 1952
 Pseudozonitis roseomaculatis Dillon, 1952
 Pseudozonitis schaefferi (Blatchley, 1922)
 Pseudozonitis stroudi Enns, 1956
 Pseudozonitis vaurieae Enns, 1956
 Pseudozonitis vigilans (Fall, 1907)
 Pseudozonitis vittipennis (Horn, 1875)
 Pseudozonitis vogti Dillon, 1952

References

Further reading

 
 
 

Meloidae
Articles created by Qbugbot